Peters Reservation is a nature reserve located in Dover, Massachusetts. The property is owned by The Trustees of Reservations; the reservation's first parcels were received as a gift in 1988. The reservation is located across Farm Street from the Chase Woodlands, another Trustees-managed property. The Charles River Link Trail crosses both reservations.

References

External links 
 The Trustees of Reservations: Peters Reservation
 Chase Woodlands and Peters Reservation trail map
 The Fletcher Steele Archives at the SUNY College of Environmental Science and Forestry

The Trustees of Reservations
Open space reserves of Massachusetts
Protected areas of Norfolk County, Massachusetts
Protected areas established in 1988
1988 establishments in Massachusetts